Well Number 5, also called 164th Street Artesian Well, is an artesian well in North Lynnwood, Washington at Swamp Creek.

It is one of ten artesian wells that originally supplied the Alderwood area in the 1950s. The other nine were capped when the water district contracted with the city of Everett for its supply. In 1999, the well's "secret" location was revealed in connection with public planning related to unrelated city development, upsetting some people, and in the early 2000s, when the well's taps were moved  from a wooded area beside Swamp Creek to a more visible structure alongside 164th Street, the upgraded accessibility again met resistance from some people.

The water from the well is popular with people in the Puget Sound Area who prefer water without fluoridation or chlorination, including raw water enthusiasts and beermakers. It is regularly tested for microbes and contamination, and is "one of the rare raw water sources in the country that is also part of a public water district and is held to the same strict EPA and Department of Health standards as tap [water]". , the well had never failed a quality test in 60 years. The water district that owns the well won American Water Works Association's national tapwater taste test in 2018.

The well is established as part of the culture of Lynnwood. It has been cited as a "welcome touch of the country" reminiscent of Lynnwood's previously rural character, now become a "bland city".

Notes

References

Sources

Further reading

External links

Lynnwood, Washington
Water wells in the United States